The Crișul Nou is a right tributary of the river Crișul Negru in Romania. It flows into the Crișul Negru in Lunca.

References

Rivers of Romania
Rivers of Bihor County